Hypericum atomarium is a perennial herb in the Hypericaceae family. It stands 20-80 centimeters tall with flowers 1-2 centimeters in diameter.

References

atomarium
Taxa named by Pierre Edmond Boissier